TV5 Network Inc., commonly known as TV5, is a Philippine media company based in Mandaluyong, with its alternate studios located in Novaliches, Quezon City. It is primarily involved in radio and television broadcasting, with subsidiaries and affiliates dealing in various media related businesses. TV5 is owned by MediaQuest Holdings, an investee company of Philippine telecommunications giant PLDT, through its Beneficial Trust Fund, and headed by business tycoon Manuel V. Pangilinan.

Among its assets owns and operates two broadcast television networks (TV5 and One Sports), the national radio station (Radyo5 92.3 True FM), and the regional radio network (Radyo5). It also operates two international television channels (Kapatid Channel and AksyonTV International) along with subsidiaries such as TV film productions and originals (Studio5) digital terrestrial television providers (Sulit TV) an exclusive sales and marketing agent (Media5) as well as digital and online portals technology (D5 Studio; TV5.com.ph, News5 Digital, and GG Network).

History

Origin
Joaquin "Chino" Roces, owner of The Manila Times, was granted a radio-TV franchise from Congress under Republic Act No. 2945 on June 19, 1960. He then founded the Associated Broadcasting Corporation and the channel "ABC 5" with the call sign DZTM-TV and its first studios along Pasong Tamo in Makati, becoming the fourth television network established in the country. ABC operated radio and television services from 1960 until September 23, 1972, when the late former President Ferdinand Marcos declared Martial Law. Both ABC and The Manila Times were shut down as a result.

Revival
After the People Power Revolution in 1986, Roces made a successful appeal to Corazon Aquino for the reopening of the network until his death on September 30, 1988.

New stockholders led by businessman Edward Tan and Roces's son Edgardo then began the arduous task of bringing the network back on the air. The Securities and Exchange Commission granted their application for an increase in capitalization and amendments to ABC's articles of incorporation and by-laws. They were subsequently given a permit to operate by the National Telecommunications Commission (NTC).

ABC inaugurated its studio complex and transmitter tower in San Bartolome, Novaliches, Quezon City in 1990 and began test broadcasts by the end of 1991, officially returning on air as the Associated Broadcasting Company on February 21, 1992, with ABC Development Corporation as the new corporate name. Its radio counterpart, Kool 106 was launched at the same time. Later, it acquired a new franchise to operate on December 9, 1994, under Republic Act 7831 signed by then President Fidel V. Ramos.

In 1999, ABC was awarded the channel 47 frequency in Metro Manila, the last remaining UHF frequency in the market, christening it DWDZ-TV. However, has been inactive since 2003.

Cojuangco era
In October 2003, ABC was acquired by a group led by businessman Antonio "Tonyboy" O. Cojuangco, Jr. served as Chairman of the Philippine Long Distance Telephone Company (PLDT) from 1998 to 2004 and owner of Dream Satellite Broadcasting and Bank of Commerce, among other assets.

Its biggest achievement was when its flagship channel, ABC, won as the "Outstanding TV Station" award at the 2005 KBP Golden Dove Awards, with several other programs on the network also earning honors in their respective categories.

In early 2007, ABC suffered a setback when it implemented a series of budget cuts, primarily directed towards its news department, which laid off most of its employees.

In 2008, ABC-5 was rebranded as TV5 as it enters a partnership with MPB Primedia Inc., a local company backed by Media Prima Berhad of Malaysia as part of a long-term strategy to make the station more competitive. This caused the revitalization of its ratings from 1.9% in July 2008 (before the re-branding) to 11.1% in September 2009.

Acquisition by PLDT
On October 20, 2009, Media Prima announced that it would be divesting its 70% share in TV5/MPB Primedia and selling it to the Philippine Long Distance Telephone Company's broadcasting arm, MediaQuest Holdings, Inc. as the company incurs losses in the midst of global financial crisis. MediaQuest also acquired Cojuangco-owned ABC Development Corporation and its television stations by the end of the year. The two acquisitions was completed on March 2, 2010, as announced by PLDT chairman Manuel V. Pangilinan. TV5 was reformatted on April 4, 2010, with a new lineup of programming and branding as the "Kapatid" ("sibling") network. ABC's radio arm Dream FM was retained under Cojuangco management  after the latter had transferred its ownership to Interactive Broadcast Media. By July 2011, Dream FM Network was closed and its Manila station was sold to Ultrasonic Broadcasting System and relaunched as 106.7 Energy FM.

Upon acquisition, TV5 expressed interest to acquire the 27.24% controlling share of Indosiar Karya Media, which operates Indosiar, by-then owned by PLDT affiliate Salim Group to transform the network as the pan-regional multimedia leader in Southeast Asia. The agreement was projected to be reached by 2011, but it was never conceptualized after Indosiar merged to Surya Citra Media, a subsidiary of Emtek in 2013.

On October 1, 2010, TV5 took over the management of MediaQuest's Nation Broadcasting Corporation stations; DWFM was re-launched as a TV5-branded news radio station on November 8, 2010, Radyo5 92.3 NewsFM, and DWNB-TV was re-launched as AksyonTV on February 21, 2011, a news channel based on TV5's newscast Aksyon.

In June 2011, Sports5 began a deal with the state-run Intercontinental Broadcasting Corporation to produce sports programming for the network under the brand AKTV. The block time deal ended on May 31, 2013, although TV5 continues to use IBC-13's Broadcast City facilities for sports events as MediaQuest Holdings is a possible bidder for the privatization of IBC-13.

Through co-owned Pilipinas Global Network Ltd., international channels Kapatid TV5 and AksyonTV International were launched in April 2011. The channels were available in Europe, Middle East, North Africa, Guam, and the United States.

TV5 has also entered the social media space as it began its online lifestyle site Kristn.com, a Pinoy online music portal Balut Radio and news video content site News5 Everywhere. Kristn and Balut Radio are inactive since December 2014.

Rey Espinosa stepped down as ABC Development Corporation President and CEO on June 1, 2013, to assume his new post as Associate Director of the First Pacific Company Ltd., PLDT's majority owner. He was replaced by Noel C. Lorenzana, the Head of the Individual Business for the PLDT Group.

By December 23, 2013, the network relocated and began broadcasting from its new headquarters, the 6,000 square meter TV5 Media Center located in Reliance, Mandaluyong; vacating its Novaliches complex,  which is in use from 1992, as well as its studios in Delta Theater (Quezon City), Broadway Centrum (New Manila), Marajo Tower (Bonifacio Global City) and the PLDT Locsin Building (Makati). The transmitter and corporate offices of TV5 remained in Novaliches, Quezon City. Phase 1 (News5 Center) was completed on the same day while Phase 2 of the building (Entertainment Building, now the Launchpad Center) is currently under construction. Once the Media Center is completed in 2016, it will house TV5, and their sister companies Cignal Digital TV, Voyager Innovations and Philex Mining.

Upon failure of acquiring a stake on GMA Network, TV5's ultimate parent, the Philippine Long Distance Telephone Company (PLDT) pours more funds to TV5. PLDT's subsidiary, ePLDT, Inc., invests P6-billion in the form of Philippine Depositary Receipts (PDRs) in MediaQuest to sustain the growth momentum of TV5 as well as affiliate Cignal TV. PLDT will also install new platforms and technology that will suit consumers’ preference. TV5 Chair Manny Pangilinan predicted that TV5 would "break even" by 2017.

In response to the process of shifting to Digital Terrestrial Television, TV5 invested P500-700 million in the next four years as preparation for its shift to digital TV. Currently, TV5 and AksyonTV conduct digital test broadcasts on channels 42 and 51, operated by TV5 affiliates Nation Broadcasting Corporation and Mediascape, respectively. It also plans to convert its UHF stations that operate TV5 and AksyonTV, to DTV transmitters.

In December 2014, ABC Development Corporation partnered with Singapore-based studio Brand New Media to launch a multi-channel datacasting service 4ME Philippines. 4ME will feature original content, produced both in the Philippines and internationally, for a network of lifestyle channels covering food, health, fashion, tech, comedy, travel, home, entertainment, celebrity, sport, outdoor adventure and music. With the domain www.TV4ME.ph, 4ME was targeted to launch in 2015. Brand New Media has already launched a similar service in Australia.

In 2015, the company changed its name from ABC Development Corporation to TV5 Network Inc.

TV5 Network Inc. also launched its digital library of original online content called Digital5, using the company's online portals to produce exclusive programs that compass different audiences on different platforms.

On August 3, 2015, TV5 Network Inc. and Cignal TV ties up with Viva Communications to form an entertainment network the Sari-Sari Channel that will air programs and movies from both the Viva portfolio and TV5. SSN will also handle the production of all the entertainment programs of TV5. Instead of this, TV5 has appointed Viva head honcho Vic del Rosario, Jr. as the network's chief entertainment strategist in October 2015.

On October 1, 2016, Media5 president and former Gilas Pilipinas and PBA head coach Chot Reyes became the network's officer-in-charge, replacing the network's president for four years, Noel Lorenzana, who retired from his position on September 30.

On February 17, 2018, TV5 launched its new slogan called "Get It On 5!". Along with the said launch, the network also started its five-brand strategy which consists of News5 (News), ESPN5 (Sports), On5 (Entertainment and other content), D5 Studio (Digital) and the newly revived Studio5 (Films and Originals).

On April 22, 2019, TV5 Network was granted a 25-year legislative franchise extension under Republic Act NO. 11320 albeit without President Rodrigo Duterte's signature and lapsed into law after 30 days of inaction by the President.

Upon the retirement of Chot Reyes as TV5's president and CEO, he was replaced by Media5 President (TV5's sales and marketing arm) Jane Basas.

On February 4, 2020, Robert P. Galang was appointed as the new president and CEO of TV5 Network and Cignal TV, replacing Basas who had been appointed as the new Chief Marketing Officer of Smart Communications.

On August 15, 2020, TV5 Network announced partnership with its sister company, Cignal TV to become as TV5's main content provider to handle the network's programming in order to bring back the glory days of TV5 to compete again with GMA Network, TV5's longtime rival and other TV networks in the Philippines after the expiration of the congressional franchise of ABS-CBN in May 2020. In 2021,TV5 and rival network ABS-CBN signs a deal that lets ABS-CBN programs to be broadcast in TV5 along with its own shows, and also released a new cable channel named "BuKo" that airs comedy shows which is only available in Cignal.
TV5 also released a new digital tv set-top box called the "Sulit TV" which transmits TV5's digital frequencies as well as other available digital channels, and is competing with ABS-CBN TV Plus and GMA Affordabox.

In September of the same year,University Athletic Association of the Philippines or commonly known as UAAP, inked a deal with Cignal to launch UAAP Varsity Channel to air UAAP basketball and volleyball events and is also simulcast on TV5 and One Sports.

In January 2021, TV5 started broadcast of selected programming produced by ABS-CBN to expand its nationwide reach following the shutdown of the latter's free-to-air network on May 5, 2020. On January 24, the Kapatid network began to simulcast ABS-CBN's Sunday noontime programming block, followed by the addition of the latter's primetime block on March 5 and its noontime show on July 16, 2022.

In June 2022, ABS-CBN engaged into advanced talks with TV5's parent company, MediaQuest Holdings to allow its resources combined after Villar Group-backed Advanced Media Broadcasting System acquired ABS-CBN's former frequency, and slated to begin operations in October 2022 as AMBS-2. On August 10, 2022, ABS-CBN and MediaQuest Holdings signed a "convertible note agreement" as announced on the following day for the ABS-CBN's investment into TV5 Network by acquiring 34.99% of the company's common shares, with an option to increase it stake to 49.92% within the next eight years with MediaQuest remained as the TV5's controlling shareholder with 64.79% of TV5's common shares. Meanwhile, MediaQuest Holdings executed a "debt instruments agreement" they will acquire a 38.88% minority stake of ABS-CBN's cable TV arm Sky Cable Corporation through Cignal TV, with an option to acquire an additional 61.12% of Sky Cable shares within the next eight years. After ABS-CBN and TV5 had a partnership deal, the House of Representatives has set a briefing and SAGIP Representative Rodante Marcoleta commented that TV5 violated the broadcasting franchise with ABS-CBN deal. But a day later, the briefing scheduled was cancelled that supposed to happen on that day. On August 24, the two broadcasting companies agreed to pause their closing preparations for the deal following concerns from politicians and some government agencies. On September 1, 2022, both parties announced the termination of the proposed investment.

On January 31, 2023, Guido R. Zaballero as president and chief executive officer of TV5 Network, effective February 1, 2023. He will assume the position following the retirement of Robert P. Galang, who headed Cignal TV and TV5 since 2020. Meanwhile, Jane J. Basas has assumed the post of president and CEO of Cignal TV, concurrently with her role as the president and CEO of MediaQuest, the holding company of TV5 and Cignal TV.

Broadcast assets

TV5

TV5 or simply as 5 (formerly known as ABC) is the flagship broadcast asset of the network. Founded on June 19, 1960, it is branded as the Kapatid (Sibling) Network in reference to the company's logo. Its headquarters can be found at the TV5 Media Center in Mandaluyong and alternative studios in Novaliches in Quezon City.

Its programming includes news and information shows from News5, sports programming produced by One Sports, anime, teleserye, soap operas, foreign dramas and cartoons, movie blocks, comedy and gag shows, game shows, as well as informative, talk shows, musicals, reality, and variety shows.

One Sports

One Sports is a television station of TV5 Network Inc. with Nation Broadcasting Corporation (NBC) as its primary content provider, and was launched on March 8, 2020. One Sports serves as a sports channel for The 5 Network with its programs primarily produced by its sports division of the same name. It was formerly called 5 Plus, when it was launched on January 13, 2019, and AksyonTV, a Filipino-language news channel launched by TV5 in 2011–2019.

Radyo5

Radyo5 is a collective name for the news/talk FM radio stations of the Nation Broadcasting Corporation. The stations' all-news format is co-branded with News5, the news department of the television channel TV5. The first one to adopt the format is DWFM 92.3 FM on October 1, 2010, followed by DYNC 101.9 FM Cebu on November 12, 2012, and DXFM 101.9 FM Davao on December 3, 2012, with 4 relay stations serving Baguio, Bacolod, Cagayan de Oro and General Santos City, as well as one affiliate station in Dagupan.

Cable/Satellite assets

Most of the assets containing cable channels and its related content are handled by Cignal TV, TV5 Network's sister company.

Internet and social media

News5 Digital
News5 Digital (News5.com.ph) (formerly known as News5 Everywhere) is the official news portal, online video and audio content management platform and Social TV of TV5. It also serves as online and on-demand streaming portal for TV5 and AksyonTV as well as serving as an online citizen journalism portal of News5.

One Sports
One Sports (ESPN5.com) is the official webpage of ESPN in the Philippines, in conjunction with One Sports. Its content draws upon the resources of both ESPN (for global articles) and One Sports (for Philippines-originating articles).

Digital5

Digital5, an online programming division of TV5, provides an array of online-exclusive content with various genres that can be viewed on all platforms through the online portals of TV5, One Sports, News5 Digital and GG Network.

International presence

TV5's International Presence is overseen by Pilipinas Global Limited, Ltd. (PGN), a joint subsidiary of TV5 Network Inc. (40%) and its parent the Philippine Long Distance Telephone Company (60%), Founded on April 11, 2011, at the British Virgin Islands, it has two subsidiaries of its own, PGN (Canada) Ltd., based in British Columbia, and the PGN (US) LLC., incorporated through the Delaware General Corporation Law and currently based on California. Through these subsidiaries, PGN acts as the sole and exclusive distributor and licensee of the programs, shows, films and channels of TV5 through international syndication and its owned-and-operated channels, the Kapatid TV5 and AksyonTV International.

Prior to this, TV5 (formerly ABC-5) airs its programs through an international channel, The Mabuhay Channel and its counterpart in Canada. The Mabuhay Channel features a wide array of programming from movies, music, sports, entertainment, current affairs to children's and lifestyle programming from ABC-5 as well as PTV-4, IBC-13, the CCI Asia Group and Viva Entertainment. It is founded on July 22, 2004, by Philippine Multimedia Systems, Inc. (PMSI), current operator of Dream Satellite TV and by-then sister company of ABC-5 (PMSI and ABC-5 are owned by Antonio "Tonyboy" Cojuangco, Jr.) It was closed on August 18, 2008, 9 days after ABC-5's rebrand to TV5 and due to the channel's pullout from Dish Network.

Defunct services

AKTV

AKTV was a primetime sports programming block produced by Sports5 division of TV5 and was aired on state-run Intercontinental Broadcasting Corporation (IBC). Formed by an blocktime agreement on February 28, 2011, it was launched on June 5, 2011, by an AKTV Run at the SM Mall of Asia in Pasay. However, due to high airtime cost and low ratings caused by the impending privatization of IBC, AKTV ceased airing in May 2013 although TV5 continues to use IBC's Broadcast City facilities for its sports programming as TV5's parent, MediaQuest Holdings, has a potential bid for its privatization that was aimed to happen by 2016, However, MediaQuest could not join the privatization bid due to ownership rules and regulations that MediaQuest owns TV5 and AksyonTV.

Dream FM Network

Dream FM Network is the original radio network of ABC Development Corporation when it is reopened in 1992. With its flagship station DWET 106.7 FM Manila (now airing as Energy FM which is owned by Ultrasonic Broadcasting System), DYET 106.7 FM Cebu (now DYQC 106.7 FM, airing as 1067 Home Radio Cebu which is owned by Aliw Broadcasting Corporation), and DXET 106.7 FM Davao (currently inactive), it undergoes multiple format, including Hot AC, Top 40 hits, Original Pilipino Music and sometimes, Latin music. Upon acquisition of the conglomerate by Antonio "Tonyboy" O. Cojuangco, Jr., the radio network flipped its format into smooth jazz format added up with R&B, Soul, Bossa Nova and House, remained unchanged after its TV counterpart ABC-5 reformatted in 2008. The radio network was not part of acquisition of ABC Development Corporation by the MediaQuest Holdings in 2010 since the latter has Nation Broadcasting Corporation's FM stations, which later branded to News5 as Radyo5 NewsFM. Dream FM was retained under the Cojuangco management and operated by former ABC stockholder Anton Lagdameo, with Cojuangco already transferred ABC's entire FM stations to Interactive Broadcast Media (IBMI). Majority of Dream FM stations closed in June 2011 as Ultrasonic Broadcasting System acquired the operations of DWET 106.7 FM Manila and reformatted on July 1 as Energy FM Manila (Energy FM was formerly on DWKY 91.5 FM, now 91.5 Win Radio). Only DYKP retained its operations as Boracay Beach Radio.

Balut Radio

Balut Radio was an Internet radio service of TV5 Network Inc. Founded on April 1, 2013, it featured OPM and international music channels, as well as news and sports channels powered by News5 as well as radio channel that can be customized by users. By September 2014, Balut Radio becomes inactive.

Kristn
Kristn, (kristn.com) also known as Hitlist by Kristn, was an online lifestyle hub of TV5. It featured exclusive content on food & dining, movies, tech & gaming, music & events, men's lifestyle and celebrity features. By January 2015, Kristn becomes inactive after the launch of similar service, TV4ME Philippines.

TV4ME Philippines

TV4ME Philippines was a digital advertorial datacasting service operated under the joint venture of TV5 and Brand New Media, a Singapore-based online content provider. It offered original programs that ranges from food, health, travel, shopping, motoring, property, business, finance, careers, sports, hobbies, and technology. This service is currently inactive due to financial constraints.

Catsup
Catsup (pronounced as Catch-Up) was a digital-exclusive subchannel of TV5 Network available only in Manila, where its digital signal is being tested. Under test broadcast, it airs re-runs of top-rated programs from TV5 and selected Sports5 coverages. It also aired replays of selected News5 documentaries and classic Filipino movies on weekends. However, on February 1, 2017, Catsup have been discontinued its broadcasting due to unknown reasons.

InterAksyon

InterAksyon (interaksyon.com) is an online news portal of TV5 launched in 2011. It features articles and editorials from respected journalists and News5 reporters. The website also developed the TNAV (Traffic Navigator) which features real-time traffic updates from the MMDA. The service was under the management of News5 from its launch until March 31, 2018. Currently, the PhilStar Media Group, another company under MediaQuest, handles the site under its own digital group.

AksyonTV

AksyonTV (Action TV) was a news and sports television network co-owned by TV5 Network and Nation Broadcasting Corporation. Founded on February 21, 2011, AksyonTV's programs comprised a combination of live news reports, documentaries, sports and current affairs programming. Its existing lineup of programming draws upon TV5's own resources and its news partners. It also aired simulcasts programs of Radyo5 92.3 News FM and news programs of TV5. The channel was shut down on January 12, 2019, and it was replaced by 5 Plus. AksyonTV's sports programs was carried by 5 Plus, while Radyo5 simulcast programs moved to the new stand-alone satellite channel under Radyo5 brand prior to the launch of One PH, exclusively on Cignal.

5 Plus

5 Plus was a commercial sports terrestrial television network co-owned by TV5 Network and Nation Broadcasting Corporation. Named after its parent station, it served as complementary channel for 5 with its programs primarily produced by ESPN5. 5 Plus was launched on January 13, 2019, replacing AksyonTV, until it ceased its broadcast on March 7, 2020, to give way for One Sports.

Fox Filipino

TV5 archived programs were aired on Fox Filipino, a Philippine-exclusive cable/satellite channel owned and operated by Fox Networks Group (Philippines), a local subsidiary of The Walt Disney Company through its Direct-to-Consumer and International division. Fox Filipino was launched on March 1, 2012, until it ceased its broadcasting on July 7, 2020, to give way for Cignal-owned, One Screen.

Executive management
 Manuel V. Pangilinan (chairman of the Board)
 Guido R. Zaballero (president and chief executive officer, director)
 Dino Laurena (chief operating officer, director, Media5)
 Pierre Paul S. Buhay (Treasurer and Chief Financial Officer)
 Estrelita G. Gacutan (corporate secretary)
 Michael Rex O. Celiz (assistant corporate secretary)
 Luchi Cruz-Valdes (first vice president for news and information, News5 chief)
 Perci Intalan (head for programming)
 Sienna Olaso (head of One Sports)

Other assets

Divisions
D5 Studio
News5
One Sports
Rescue5
TV5 Entertainment Group
Archangel Productions
Brightlight Productions
Cignal Entertainment
Cornerstone Studios
Viva Entertainment
TV5 Regional (dissolved 2016)

Subsidiaries and affiliates
BusinessWorld
Cignal TV (Mediascape Inc.)
Cignal
CignalPlay
SatLite
 Cinegear, Inc. (65.7%)
Media5 Marketing Corporation (Media5)
Nation Broadcasting Corporation
Studio5, Inc.
Straight Shooters
The Philippine Star
Pilipinas Global Network Ltd. (35.4%)
 Kapatid Channel
 AksyonTV International
Sulit TV
UXS, Inc.  (30%)
TV5 Talent Center (dissolved 2016)

Corporate social responsibility
Alagang Kapatid Foundation
PLDT-Smart Foundation
One Meralco Foundation

References

External links
 
 Media Ownership Monitor Philippines - Media Companies: A Duopoly Rules by VERA Files and Reporters Without Borders

 
1960 establishments in the Philippines
Broadcasting companies of the Philippines
Companies based in Mandaluyong
Companies based in Quezon City
Entertainment companies established in 1960
Entertainment companies of the Philippines
Mass media companies established in 1960
Mass media companies of the Philippines
Mass media in Metro Manila
2010 mergers and acquisitions
MediaQuest Holdings
Philippine radio networks